The 2023 Bolivian Primera División season, known as the 2023 Liga Tigo season for sponsorship reasons, is the 46th season of the División Profesional del Fútbol Boliviano, Bolivia's top-flight football league and the sixth season under División de Fútbol Profesional management. The season started on 4 February 2023.

Bolívar are the defending champions.

Format
On 11 November 2022, the Bolivian Football Federation announced that the 2023 season of the División Profesional would have 17 teams, as the division's Higher Council decided that no club would be directly relegated to the Bolivian Football Regional Leagues. With this, the 2022 Copa Simón Bolívar earned a direct spot in the top tier, while the runners-up played a promotion/relegation play-off against the last-placed team in the aggregate table, Universitario de Sucre.

The format for the season was confirmed after a meeting of the División Profesional's Council held on 13 January 2023. Teams will play two parallel tournaments in the season: a double round-robin league tournament which will be played on weekends and will crown the season's only champion and a league cup tournament which will be played on weekdays with a group stage and an eight-team knockout stage. The champions of both tournaments will qualify for the 2024 Copa Libertadores, whilst the league cup runners-up will qualify for the 2024 Copa Sudamericana. The remaining international berths as well as relegation will be decided by an aggregate table which will consider the performance of teams in both the league tournament and the group stage of the División Profesional cup. The two teams with the lowest average at the end of the season will be directly relegated to the regional leagues, while the team with the next lowest average will play a relegation play-off series, this in order to return to 16 teams in the league for the following season.

Teams
17 teams compete in the league for the 2023 season, 15 of which took part in 2022. Vaca Díez are taking part in the top flight for the first time ever, ensuring their promotion on 24 November 2022 after winning the 2022 Copa Simón Bolívar, whilst Libertad Gran Mamoré were also promoted after winning the promotion/relegation play-off against Universitario de Sucre, who were relegated after one season in the top flight.

Stadia and locations

Notes

Personnel and kits

Managerial changes

Notes

Standings

Results

Top scorers

{| class="wikitable" border="1"
|-
! Rank
! Player
! Club
! Goals
|-
| rowspan=3 align=center | 1
| Gilbert Álvarez
|Palmaflor del Trópico
| rowspan=3 align=center | 5
|-
| Ronnie Fernández
|Bolívar
|-
| Dorny Romero
|Always Ready
|-
| rowspan=3 align=center | 4
| Jonathan Cañete
|Palmaflor del Trópico
| rowspan=3 align=center | 4
|-
| Enrique Triverio
|The Strongest
|-
| Ramiro Vaca
|Bolívar
|-
| rowspan=8 align=center | 7
| Víctor Ábrego
|Universitario de Vinto
| rowspan=8 align=center | 3
|-
| Junior Arias
|The Strongest
|-
| Efmamjjasond González
|Real Santa Cruz
|-
| Roy Ndoutoumo
|Universitario de Vinto
|-
| Martín Prost
|Nacional Potosí
|-
| Gastón Rodríguez
|Blooming
|-
| Federico Sellecchia
|Royal Pari
|-
| Tommy Tobar
|Nacional Potosí
|}

Source: Soccerway

Aggregate table
For this season, the aggregate table will consider the performance of teams in the 2023 División Profesional league tournament as well as the group stage of the 2023 Copa de la División Profesional. Given the odd number of teams in the league for the season and the uneven size of groups in the Copa de la División Profesional, this table will be based on averages, dividing the sum of points in both tournaments by the total number of games played in both tournaments for each team.

See also
2023 Copa de la División Profesional

References

External links
 División Profesional on the FBF's official website 

2023
P
Bolivia
Bolivia